Lieutenant General Sebastian Ndeitunga (nom-de-guerre Haitota) (born 1962) is the former Inspector General of the Namibian Police Force. He was appointed by president Hifikepunye Pohamba in 2005, succeeding Lucas Hangula. Ndeitunga is also the current vice president of the International Criminal Police Organization (INTERPOL) for Africa. When he retires in August 2022, Ndeitunga will be the longest serving police chief since Namibian independence.

Ndeitunga was born around 1962 in an Angolan village a few kilometres north of the Namibian border. He did not have a birth certificate until 1993 when he made a sworn statement to the Namibian Ministry of Home Affairs. Ndeitunga holds a Bachelor of Laws and a postgraduate certificate in maritime law from the University of Havana in Cuba.

Awards and recognition
Outstanding Meritorious Service of Highest Order, awarded by the President of the Republic of Namibia, 
SARPCCO Medal for distinct service and the International Leadership Award from the United Kingdom
Most Distinguished Order of Namibia: First Class, conferred on Heroes' Day 2014.

References

Interpol officials
Living people
1962 births
Namibian police officers